Manolis Bikakis (1954 – 1994) was a Greek commando and war hero of the defense of Cyprus during the Turkish invasion.

Turkish Invasion of Cyprus
Bikakis served with the Greek Alpha Raider Squadron which was secretly airlifted to Cyprus with Operation Niki during the night of 21st July 1974 and in the early morning of 22nd. 
The Alpha Raider Squadron had the objective to reinforce the ELDYK units defending the island and was assigned to the airport of Nicosia (see:Battle of Nicosia Airport). During the second phase of invasion launched on August 14, 1974, the Squadron was dispersed confronting the invading Turks in the area of Ayios Dhometios. Bikakis had been ordered to provide anti-tank cover with a 90-mm M67 recoilless antitank rifle. 
During the clashes, he was separated from his comrades who later presumed him dead. Repeatedly changing his position, Bikakis fought alone for four days and destroyed six M48A2 battle tanks with his M67 and fired his last two rounds at a building where Turkish troops had taken cover. His actions held up an entire Turkish battalion as a result.

Aftermath
Bikakis and his fellow raiders contributed decisively to repelling the Turkish forces in their sector, saving Nicosia from falling to them.

Despite the fact that his commander recommended him for a Medal for Gallantry, for political reasons Bikakis did not receive any honors nor was his courage publicly recognized whilst he was alive.

Bikakis died in a car accident in 1994, while driving on the GR-8A road.

He was officially honored posthumously in 2015, more than 40 years after his actions.

References

1954 births
1994 deaths
20th-century Greek people
Greek military personnel of the Turkish invasion of Cyprus
1974 in Cyprus
People from Heraklion (regional unit)